El Macero is an unincorporated community and census-designated place (CDP) just outside the city limits of Davis, California, United States, in Yolo County. Until 2006 it had a separate ZIP Code, 95618.  In 2006, eastern and southern parts of Davis were added to the 95618 zone. Formerly, a separate post office served El Macero; this is now closed.  El Macero was named for Bruce Mace, on whose land it was built. The community is in area code 530. It lies at an elevation of 36 feet (11 m). A golf course is in the community.

El Macero corresponds to Yolo County census tract 104.01, block group 1, at the 2010 census, which had a population of 619. The racial makeup of El Macero was 533 (86.1%) White, 0 (0%) African American, 0 (0%) Native American, 64 (10.3%) Asian, 0 (0%) Pacific Islander, 0 (0%) from other races, and 22 (3.6%) from two or more races.  Hispanic or Latino of any race were 37 persons (6.0%).

References

External links

 El Macero on the Davis Wiki

Census-designated places in California
Census-designated places in Yolo County, California
Unincorporated communities in the Sacramento metropolitan area